Beaver Ranch 163 is an Indian reserve in Alberta.  It is occupied by the Tallcree First Nation.

References

Indian reserves in Alberta
Cree reserves and territories